The Society For Evidence-Based Gender Medicine (SEGM) is an activist non-profit organisation that is known for  mischaracterizing standards of care for transgender youth and engaging in political lobbying using misinformation which contradicts the evidence base around transgender healthcare. The group routinely cites the discredited theory of rapid-onset gender dysphoria and has falsely claimed that conversion therapy can only be practiced on the basis of sexual orientation instead of gender identity. SEGM opposes informed consent for transgender healthcare for people under the age of 25. SEGM is often cited in anti-transgender legislation and court cases, sometimes providing evidence briefs themselves. It is not recognized as a scientific organization by the international medical community.

Researchers at the Yale School of Medicine issued a report which described SEGM as a small group of anti-trans activists. A commentary published in the journal Clinical Practice in Pediatric Psychology described them as a "discriminatory advocacy organization". Joshua Safer, a spokesperson for the Endocrine Society, described them as outside the medical mainstream. Aviva Stahl stated they were "pushing flawed science" and Mallory Moore stated they have "ties to evangelical activists".

SEGM is closely affiliated with Genspect: seven advisors to SEGM are on Genspect's team of advisors, including Stella O'Malley, Genspect's founder.

Activities and positions 
William Malone, a founder of SEGM, has opposed the informed consent model for transgender healthcare, where adults older than 18 can start hormones after signing an informed consent document without requiring an evaluation by a mental health professional. He told Medscape that "cognitive maturity doesn’t occur until the age of 25."

SEGM made a submission in defense of the state of Arizona's ban on Medicaid coverage for transgender healthcare. In it, they advanced the idea of rapid-onset gender dysphoria (ROGD), which suggests a subtype of gender dysphoria caused by peer influence and social contagion. ROGD has been condemned as unevidenced and nonscientific by the majority of the worlds' major psychological bodies. Lambda Legal and Cooley LLP filed an amicus brief opposing the ban on behalf of LGBT advocacy organizations such as PFLAG, the Southern Arizona Gender Alliance, and the TransActive Gender Project. The Pediatric Endocrine Society and the World Professional Association for Transgender Health also filed amicus briefs opposing the ban.

In March 2022, Julia Mason, a board member of SEGM who also works with Genspect, proposed Resolution 27 along with four other members of the American Academy of Pediatrics (AAP), stating the AAP should reconsider hormone therapy as a first line of treatment and called for an evidence review to update AAP's 2018 policy statement on gender affirmative care. The resolution wasn't passed. Genspect and the physicians who proposed the resolution claimed that they were being sidelined and that the AAP changed its processes to block discussion of the resolution. In response, the AAP said they mischaracterized the current standards of care, which call for intake and collaboration between clinicians and mental health professionals. They also said that the process worked normally and that Resolution 27 did not pass because it received no co-sponsorship and the majority of AAP members did not agree with the resolution. The AAP stated the guidelines were already under review as part of a routine procedure and that "there is strong consensus among the most prominent medical organizations worldwide that evidence-based, gender-affirming care for transgender children and adolescents is medically necessary and appropriate."

In April, the Florida Department of Health wrote a memo which misrepresented the scientific consensus to stop minors in the state from socially or medically transitioning and cited Malone. The Florida Phoenix described the Florida Board of Medicine, which has 15 members appointed by the Governor and approved by the senate, as "stacked with anti-trans doctors, some of whom are affiliated with anti-trans fringe movements such as Genspect and the Society for Evidence-based Gender Medicine". The U.S. Department of Health and Human Services stated "gender-affirming care for minors, when medically appropriate and necessary, improves their physical and mental health. Attempts to restrict, challenge, or falsely characterize this potentially lifesaving care as abuse is dangerous."

Professor Dianna Kenny, speaking for SEGM, told the Daily Telegraph that "Let’s Talk About Bodies, Identity and Sexuality", a video produced by the Australian Human Rights Commission (AHRC), teaches "gender ideology". An AHRC spokesperson said "many primary school-aged students have questions about gender and sexual identity, particularly those with connections to LGBTQI+ families or communities" and "while the commission appreciates there are a range of views in the community about these issues, the video is factual and accurate in reflecting a rights-based approach to gender and sexual identity, and is an age-appropriate teaching resource."

Conversion therapy 

SEGM clinical and academic advisor William Malone told The Christian Post in 2019 that "No child is born in the wrong body, but for a variety of reasons some children and adolescents become convinced that they were". He has also argued that "early social gender transition may cement a young person's transgender identity, and lead minors on the path to eventual medicalization". Malone and fellow SEGM member Colin Wright asserted in Quillette that "counseling can help gender dysphoric adolescents resolve any trauma or thought processes that have caused them to desire an opposite sexed body". The American Academy of Pediatrics and Substance Abuse and Mental Health Services Administration have concluded any therapeutic intervention with the goal of changing a youth's gender identity or expression is inappropriate and harmful.

In May, 2021, SEGM called to amend the Canadian criminal code C-6, which outlawed conversion therapy, falsely claiming that conversion therapy can only be applied to lesbian, gay, and bisexual people as opposed to transgender people as well. This position is not supported by any major medical organization, which define conversion therapy as including efforts to change sexual orientation or gender identity.

In the article published by The Economist, an endocrinolist and a board member of SEGM William Malone compared the ongoing gender-indentity medical debate with the opioid crisis in the US: “William Malone... sees parallels with previous medical scandals, not least the opioid crisis. There is a mix of “Big Pharma, a vulnerable patient population, and physicians misled by medical organisations or tempted by wealth and prestige”, he says. But now there is gender-identity ideology on top. “We are completely saturated with corporate influences and lobby groups,” says Dr Malone. “The only way they will be halted is if a massive number of people are harmed and they get together to sue the people who harmed them.

In "Early transgender identity tends to endure, study suggests," published by the Associated Press on May 3, 2022, journalist and medical writer Lindsay Tanner cited SEGMs advisor Dr. William Malone's opinion opposite a five-year study published online in Pediatrics: “that early social gender transition may cement a young person’s transgender identity, and lead minors on the path to eventual medicalization, with all its inherent risks and uncertainties.”

Citations in anti-trans legislation 
In Texas, Attorney General Ken Paxton cited SEGM's statement that "childhood-onset gender dysphoria has been shown to have a high rate of natural resolution, with 61-98% of children reidentifying with their biological sex during puberty" in a bill that would define providing gender-affirming care to minors as "child abuse". The statistic is cited from a paper which showed a strong association between the intensity of a child's dysphoria and its persistence.

In March 2020, SEGM was cited in an Idaho bill barring transgender people from changing their sex on their birth certificate. A SEGM spokesperson said they never expressed support for the bill. The legislation stated SEGM "has declared that the conflation of sex and gender in health care is alarming, subjects hundreds of thousands of individuals to the risk of unintended medical harm, and will greatly impede medical research" without providing evidence for the claims. The ACLU condemned the state for their actions. Malone also testified to the legislature in favor of a bill that would make it a felony to prescribe hormone blockers to people under 18 or refer them to gender-reassignment surgery.

In February 2023, Mike Leman spoke for the Catholic Dioceses in support of Wyoming Senate File 111, which ban gender-affirming care for minors. He cited a study from SEGM that questioned Dutch research into such care.

Affiliations 

SEGM is closely affiliated with the non-profit organization Genspect: Julia Mason, Marcus Evans, Roberto D’Angelo, Sasha Ayad, Stella O'Malley, Lisa Marchiano, and Avi Ring are advisors for SEGM and are on Genspect's team or advisors; O'Malley is the founder of Genspect.

The Yale School of Medicine issued a report which stated "The core members of SEGM frequently serve together on the boards of other organizations that oppose gender-affirming treatment and, like SEGM, feature biased and unscientific content. These include Genspect, Gender Identity Challenge (GENID), Gender Health Query, Rethink Identity Medicine Ethics, Sex Matters, Gender Exploratory Therapy Team, Gender Dysphoria Working Group, and the Institute for Comprehensive Gender Dysphoria Research."

Trans Safety Network (TSN) reported that NHS pediatrician Julie Maxwell has been an advisor for SEGM since its inception, that Maxwell also works for the Christian anti-LGBT and anti-abortion sex education charity LoveWise UK and has offered to help push abstinence-based and anti-LGBT sex education in schools, and that since 2012, Maxwell has been a member of the Family Education Trust, a campaigning charity that promotes anti-LGBT views. TSN also reported that in 2019, SEGM Secretary William Malone co-authored a letter challenging the Endocrine Society's clinical practice guidelines on transgender healthcare with Michael K Laidlaw, Quentin Van Meter, Paul W Hruz, and Andre Van Mol, who are all members of the SPLC-designated anti-LGBT hate group the American College of Pediatricians. In addition, Van Meter is a board member of the International Federation for Therapeutic and Counseling Choice (IFTCC), an organization that openly supports conversion therapy for LGBT people. TSN reported that these authors frequently cite and collaborate with each other.

Reception 
On April 16 2021, BuzzFeed News stated "A small number of highly controversial doctors and researchers have been pushing these anti-trans bills. Representing organizations with seemingly professional names like the American College of Pediatricians or the Society for Evidence-Based Gender Medicine, they have effectively accomplished for gender dysphoria what anti-vaxxer medical professionals have sought to do for their cause: give credence to the notion that no scientific or medical consensus exists regarding the relative safety and efficacy of a given treatment, despite the clear and growing evidence to the contrary".

In August, Trans Safety Network described SEGM as "an anti-trans psychiatric and sociological think tank" and fringe group and reported that most of SEGM's funding came in donations greater than $10,000.

In August, Vice News characterized William Malone as an "anti-trans activist" and stated that while SEGM claims to be concerned about the lack of evidence surrounding gender-affirming care for young people, they use the same tactics and citations as Florida's memo, which claimed to provide a scientific basis for banning gender-affirming care but was criticized by organizations such as WPATH. Vice reached out to authors cited in the memo, who said it took their research out of context as the research, and later research, supported gender-affirming care.

In January 2023, R.V. Scheide writing in A News Cafe stated "law firms such as Center for American Liberty can count on support from anti-transgender Christian physician groups such as the Society for Evidence Based Gender Medicine for expert testimony in court cases."

Medical community 

In April 2021, Medscape Medical News asked Joshua Saferan endocrinologist from Mount Sinai acting as a spokesperson for the Endocrine Society on transgender issuesabout SEGM, SEGM member Will Malone, and their concerns about treatment for transgender youth, he stated: "This is a relatively small group that has been making the same arguments for a number of years, and they are very much outside the mainstream. It's not that there's a debate within organized medicine, where there are equal numbers of people on both sides. Dr Malone is outside of those arguments; [he is] not in the mainstream".

In March 2022, SEGM funded a paper titled "Reconsidering Informed Consent for Trans-Identified Children, Adolescents, and Young Adults" which appeared in the Journal of Sex & Marital Therapy. In June, the journal published a response which compared SEGM to the National Association for Research & Therapy of Homosexuality (NARTH), a prominent conversion therapy advocation organization which focused on sexual orientation change efforts, as they both provide "scientific experts" to testify against LGBT rights.

In April, the Yale School of Medicine issued a report in response to the attacks on transgender healthcare in Arizona and Texas which described SEGM as a small group of anti-trans activists "without apparent ties to mainstream scientific of professional organizations" whose "medical claims are not grounded in reputable science and are full of errors of omission and inclusion" and help lawmakers criminalize transgender care.

In September, a commentary published in Clinical Practice in Pediatric Psychology titled "Supporting and Advocating for Transgender and Gender Diverse Youth and Their Families Within the Sociopolitical Context of Widespread Discriminatory Legislation and Policies" used SEGM and the American College of Pediatricians as examples of "discrimatory advocacy organizations" with ties to "professionals who lack expertise in the field". They stated they spread misinformation about transgender health care by mischaracterizing clinical best practices and the scientific research base around transgender care by relying "on a very small, nonrepresentative sample of the available literature, which is often inaccurately interpreted".

In October, Science-Based Medicine described SEGM as a "transphobic organization" which is closely affiliated with Genspect, who they described as "an anti-trans gender critical (GC) organization", and stated they "both regularly peddle anti-trans pseudoscience".

In the Fall of 2022, America First Legal ran a campaign ad claiming "Joe Biden and the New Left even promote surgery on teens and young adults, removing breasts and genitals". Kaiser Health News fact checked the claim and found it false, stating "even leaders of the Society for Evidence-based Gender Medicine, who are wholly skeptical of the acceleration in gender-affirming care", found it false.

In February 2023, in response to Mike Leman citing SEGM for Wyoming Senate File 111, Dr. Alex S. Keuroghlian, who directs programs at Massachusetts General Hospital and the Fenway Institute, stated "there are a lot of unofficial, fringe and radical organizations posing deceptively as legitimate healthcare professional societies and claiming, falsely, that gender-affirming medical care causes harm".

See also 

 Standards of Care for the Health of Transgender and Gender Diverse People
 Healthcare and the LGBT community

References

Organizations that oppose transgender rights
Alternative medicine
Advocacy groups in the United States